Anthrax is a genus of bombyliid flies, commonly known as "bee-flies" due to their resemblance to bees. Most are dull black flies, and are usually small to medium in size, and many species have striking wing patterns.

Anthrax is a very large genus. While worldwide in distribution, most species are from the Palaearctic and Afrotropic regions. The genus includes species parasitic on tiger beetles – an unusual trait among the bee-flies. A. anthrax larvae parasitize bees.  Many North American species parasitize solitary wasps.

The type species is Musca morio Linnaeus, 1758, later found to be a misidentification of Musca anthrax Schrank, 1781.

Species

Anthrax actuosus Paramonov, 1935
Anthrax alagoezicus Paramonov, 1935
Anthrax albofasciatus Macquart, 1840
Anthrax alruqibi El-Hawagry, 2013
Anthrax analis Say, 1823
Anthrax anthrax (Schrank, 1781)
Anthrax argentatus (Cole, 1919)
Anthrax artemesia Marston, 1963
Anthrax atriplex Marston, 1970
Anthrax aureosquamosus Marston, 1963
Anthrax bezzianus Paramonov, 1935
Anthrax binotatus Wiedemann in Meigen 1820
Anthrax bowdeni Báez, 1983
Anthrax cascadensis Marston, 1963
Anthrax cathetodaithmos Marston, 1970
Anthrax chaparralus Marston, 1963
Anthrax chionostigma Tsacas, 1962
Anthrax cintalapa Cole, 1957
Anthrax columbiensis Marston, 1963
Anthrax cybele (Coquillett, 1894)
Anthrax dentata Becker, 1907
Anthrax distigma Wiedemann, 1828
Anthrax francoisi Evenhuis & Greathead, 1999
Anthrax gideon Fabricius, 1805
Anthrax giselae François, 1966
Anthrax greatheadi El-Hawagry, 1998
Anthrax innublipennis Marston, 1970
Anthrax johanni Zaitzev, 1997
Anthrax koebelei Marston, 1970
Anthrax larrea Marston, 1963
Anthrax laticellus Marston, 1970
Anthrax melanopogon (Becker, 1892)
Anthrax moursyi El-Hawagry, 1998
Anthrax nidicola Cole, 1952
Anthrax nigriventris Marston, 1970
Anthrax nitidus Marston, 1970
Anthrax oedipus Fabricius, 1805
Anthrax painteri Marston, 1970
Anthrax pauper (Loew, 1869)
Anthrax pelopeius François, 1966
Anthrax picea Marston, 1963
Anthrax pilosulus Strobl, 1902
Anthrax plesius (Curran, 1927)
Anthrax pluricellus Williston, 1901
Anthrax pluto Wiedemann, 1828
Anthrax punctulatus Macquart, 1835
Anthrax seriepunctatus (Osten Sacken, 1886)
Anthrax slossonae (Johnson, 1913)
Anthrax snowi Marston, 1970
Anthrax stellans (Loew, 1869)
Anthrax sticticus Klug, 1832
Anthrax striatipennis Marston, 1970
Anthrax trifasciatus Meigen, 1804
Anthrax vallicola Marston, 1963
Anthrax varius Fabricius, 1794
Anthrax virgo Egger, 1859
Anthrax zohrayensis El-Hawagry, 2002
Anthrax zonabriphagus (Portchinsky, 1895

References

Bombyliidae genera
Taxa named by Giovanni Antonio Scopoli
Bombyliidae
Diptera of Europe
Diptera of Asia
Diptera of North America